Verne may refer to:

People

Surname
Jules Verne (1828–1905), French early science-fiction writer
Adela Verne (1877–1952), English pianist and minor composer
Kaaren Verne (1918–1967), German actress
Larry Verne (1936–2013), American novelty song singer
Mathilde Verne (1865–1936), English pianist and teacher, sister of Adela Verne
Michel Verne (1861–1925), writer, son of Jules Verne

Given name
Verne Duncan (born 1934), American politician
Verne Gagne (1926–2015), former professional wrestler and wrestling promoter
Verne Langdon (1941–2011), American mask maker, musician, magician, circus clown, make-up artist, and wrestler.
Verne Lewellen (1901–1980), American professional football player and general manager of the Green Bay Packers team
Verne Long (1925–2022), American politician and famer
Verne Lundquist (born 1940), journalist for CBS
Verne Meisner (1938–2005), American polka musician
Verne Orr (1916–2008), American businessman and 14th Secretary of the Air Force
Verne Sankey (1890–1934), American kidnapper and bank robber
Verne Troyer (1969–2018), American actor and stunt man
Verne Winchell (1915–2002), founder of Winchell's Donuts

Fictional characters
Verne Brown, in the film Back to the Future
Verne, a turtle in the comic strip and animated film Over the Hedge
Verne, an alien aboard on the R.L.S. Legacy in Treasure Planet

Places
Verne, Indiana, United States
The Verne Citadel, a citadel on the Isle of Portland in Dorset, England
The Verne (HM Prison), a prison on the citadel
Verne, Doubs, a commune of the Doubs département in France
Verne (crater), a lunar crater named after Jules Verne
Verne, Salzkotten, part of the town of Salzkotten, North Rhine-Westphalia, Germany

Other uses
Verne (grape), another name for the French wine grape Peloursin

See also
Laverne (disambiguation)